Juniperus foetidissima, with common names foetid juniper or stinking juniper, is a juniper tree species in the family Cupressaceae.

Description
It has a broadly conical to rounded or irregular crown.

It is largely dioecious with separate male and female plants, but some individual plants are monoecious, producing both sexes.

The cones are berry-like, 7–13 mm in diameter, blue-black with a whitish waxy bloom, and contain 1–2 (rarely 3) seeds; they are mature in about 18 months. The male cones are 2–3.5 mm long, and shed their pollen in early spring.

It often occurs together with Juniperus excelsa, being distinguished from it by its thicker shoots, 1.2–2 mm in diameter (while J. excelsa's are 0.7–1.3 mm), and green, rather than grey-green, leaves. The crushed foliage has a strong foetid smell, from which the species gets its name.

Distribution 
There is also an isolated population in the Crimea.

References

Further reading 
 
Adams, R. P. (2004). Junipers of the World: The genus Juniperus. Victoria: Trafford. .
Farjon, A. (2005). Monograph of Cupressaceae and Sciadopitys. Royal Botanic Gardens, Kew. .

External links

Gymnosperm Database: Juniperus foetidissima
Juniperus foetidissima - information, genetic conservation units and related resources. European Forest Genetic Resources Programme (EUFORGEN)

foetidissima
Trees of Europe
Trees of Asia
Dioecious plants